İhsan Sabri Çağlayangil (1908, Istanbul – December 30, 1993, Ankara, Turkey) was a Turkish politician, being a member of the Justice Party. He also served as Minister of Foreign Affairs three times in the 1960s and 1970s and as the Acting President of Turkey.

Background and personal life
Çağlayangil was born in Istanbul in 1908. He graduated from Istanbul High School. Then he entered the School of Law at Istanbul University and graduated in 1932. 

He was married to Firuzende Çağlayangil and had a daughter named Fatma Itir Çağlayangil.

Career
After completing his studies he became a civil servant and was in charge of the arrangements for the trial and the hanging of Seyit Riza and several Kurdish leaders of the Dersim Rebellion. Çağlayangil was Governor of Bursa Province from 1954 to 1960.

He served as Minister of Labour and Social Security in the 29th government of Turkey, a caretaker government prior to the 1965 general election. After the election he served as the Minister of Foreign Affairs of Turkey from 1965 to 1971, until the 1971 coup.

He was Minister of Foreign Affairs again in 1975–1977, and 1977–1978. Çağlayangil was Chairman of the Senate from November 7, 1979 to September 12, 1980 (the 1980 coup). In this capacity he was Acting President of Turkey after Fahri Korutürk's term expired on 6 April 1980. He was a member of the Justice Party.

References

 
|-

 
|-

|-

 
|-

1908 births
1993 deaths
20th-century presidents of Turkey
Acting presidents of Turkey
Politicians from Istanbul
Turkish people of Ubykh descent
Istanbul University Faculty of Law alumni
Ministers of Foreign Affairs of Turkey
Istanbul High School alumni
Burials at Zincirlikuyu Cemetery
Justice Party (Turkey) politicians
Governors of Antalya
Governors of Bursa
Governors of Çanakkale
Members of the Senate of the Republic (Turkey)
People of the Dersim rebellion
Members of the 29th government of Turkey
Members of the 30th government of Turkey
Members of the 31st government of Turkey
Members of the 32nd government of Turkey
Members of the 39th government of Turkey
Members of the 41st government of Turkey
Turkish people of Circassian descent